Bernard Donoughue, Baron Donoughue (born 8 September 1934) is a British Labour Party politician, academic, businessman and author.

Early life and education
According to his autobiography, Donoughue was born into poverty.  He is the son of Thomas Joseph Donoughue and Maud Violet Andrews. He was educated at Campbell Secondary Modern School and Northampton Grammar School. He studied at the University of Oxford, first at Lincoln College, where he obtained 1st class honours in Modern History in 1957, then at  Nuffield College, where he graduated with a D.Phil. on the American Revolution. The early stages of his research were pursued as Charles and Julia Henry Fellow at Harvard. Donoughue moved into an academic career at London School of Economics (Lecturer, Senior Lecturer, and Reader: 1963–1974).

Political career
Donoughue went into politics to be "associated with Labour governments which defended the interests of working people and underprivileged people."
Always at the centre of London, the capital and of politics, education and business, Donoughue was a member of the editorial staff of The Economist in 1959 and 1960 when a young Labour activist supporting Hugh Gaitskell.  He was senior research officer of the Political and Economic Planning Institute between 1960 and 1963. For a long time a lecturer close to young people, he was asked by the Wilson government to join the founding Sports  Council, an advisory body to harness amateur physical recreation. Twenty years later he would make his first speech in the Lords on Sporting Events (controls) bill.

Wilson took notice of Donoughue's communication skills, displayed in his career at the London School of Economics and in his journalism, when he was appointed head of the policy research unit in 1974.  Two years before there were a flurry of questions in both houses about whether these unaccredited "political" advisers were paid from public funds.  Wilson expanded the department in No.10 who had a profound influence like never before on policy formation. For the first time the Official Report published the salaries; and as being part of the Civil Service department.

He continued to head the team under Wilson's successor, James Callaghan, and he held the office until the defeat of the Labour Party in 1979. He was an admirer and close friend of Callaghan, whose relaxed 'beer and sandwiches' approach to political interaction contrasted to the intensity of successive prime ministerial conceited wisdom that demanded heavy studying.

Out of government from 1979 to 1981, Donoughue was development director of the Economist Intelligence Unit, and in 1982-83 was assistant editor of The Times until his dismissal by a new right-wing owner Rupert Murdoch.  He gave his opinion in an interview with the New Statesman:
I’m very proud of that fact I was sacked by Murdoch. That’s an honour! There are quite a number of us with that honour, of course.
Donoughue was at the Times during Rupert Murdoch's takeover and in his first year as proprietor, and he holds the media mogul responsible for what he dubs "a diminution in the values of our society".  News International were in the throes of a business revolution in Fleet Street: at its hub was the end of a closed shop for the skilled craftsmen of the print 'chapters' who zealously guarded their trade secrets.  Murdoch's actions broke up the old union grip on the news print media; former journalists like Tony Benn were incensed but the Labour party were helpless to resist the changes from opposition. At the time he lived in Hampstead & Highgate where John McDonnell was the party's candidate for a seat won by the Conservatives in the 'landslide' election of 1983.

Donoughue was also chairman of the London Symphony Orchestra from 1979 to 1991, patron from 1989 to 1995, and has been an associate since 2000.  Around this time, he was also one of the sources inside Whitehall used by the writers of the comedy series Yes Minister, the other one being Baroness Falkender.

He was head of research and investment policy of Grieveson Grant and Co Stockbrokers from 1982 to 1986 and head of international research and director of Kleinwort Grieveson Securities Ltd from 1986 to 1988, a branch arm of the investment bank. Following this, Donoughue was executive vice-chair of LBI from 1988 to 1991, director of Towcester Racecourse Ltd from 1992 to 1997 and was made an honorary fellow of LSE. From November 1995, shortly after the Euro sceptics had been defeated by the Major government, Donoughue, still a staunchly Labour peer was appointed to the Lords Works of Arts committee.  He was not removed from this duty when a different civil dispensation came to power in 1997, until a clash with the New Labour leadership, but he was later appointed a trustee of the Victoria County History.

Donoughue helped found the British Horse Industry Confederation in 1999 and was a Consultant Member until 2003. This coincided with appointment that September with co-option onto the joint Lords and Commons committee tasked with the responsibility of drafting a new Gambling bill.  The outcome would be the licensing of so-called Big Casinos and a general release of universal internet betting rights.  On 22 Dec 2015 he declared a gift to the bookmakers union. The radical change to the status quo proved a revolution in working people's experience of gaming that would indirectly cause remedial action on payday loans.

He was a visiting professor of Government at LSE from 2000 to 2011/2012.

Donoughue became chairman of the SPRC when it was founded in 2003, and as of 2016 was still in that role. The SPRC is a non-profit organisation operating on a cost recovery basis that is responsible for the integrity of the starting price (SP).  The majority of bets on British horseracing struck with bookmakers in betting shops and other off-course outlets are paid out according to the SP.  The job of the Commission is to ensure that the returned price accurately reflects the price available on-course at the off.

House of Lords
On 21 May 1985, he was created a life peer as Baron Donoughue, of Ashton in the County of Northampton. 

Donoghue was an Opposition Labour spokesman for Energy, Heritage and Treasury matters from 1991 to 1992. In 1997, Tony Blair appointed him a junior minister at the Ministry of Agriculture, Fisheries and Food, in which role he served until 1999. He later joined the Countryside Alliance against New Labour's policy on Hunting with Dogs, and the Foot-and-mouth disease outbreak.

Donoghue is a climate change denialist and a trustee of the Global Warming Policy Foundation (a climate denialist think tank).

He is a member of Labour Friends of Israel.

Personal life
Donoughue was married to Carol Ruth Goodman from 1959 until their divorce in 1989; they have two sons and two daughters. He married Sarah, Lady Berry, widow of Sir Anthony Berry, in 2009.

Bibliography

Books 
 Bernard Donoughue and Janet Alker.  Trade Unions in a Changing Society. London: PEP, 1963.
 Bernard Donoughue.  British Politics and the American Revolution: the path to war, 1773–75. London: Macmillan, 1964. 
 W. T. Rodgers; Bernard Donoughue.  The People into Parliament: an illustrated history of the Labour Party. London: Thames and Hudson, 1966.
 Bernard Donoughue and George William Jones.  Herbert Morrison: Portrait of a Politician. London: Weidenfeld and Nicolson, 1973.   
 Bernard Donoughue.  Prime Minister: Conduct of Policy Under Harold Wilson and James Callaghan, 1974–79.  London: Jonathan Cape, 1987. 
 Bernard Donoughue. The Heat of the Kitchen: an autobiography.  London: Politicos, 2004. 
 Bernard Donoughue. Downing Street Diary: Volume 1 – With Harold Wilson in No. 10. London: Jonathan Cape, 2004. 
 Bernard Donoughue. Downing Street Diary: Volume 2 – With James Callaghan in No. 10.  London: Pimlico, 2009.  
 Bernard Donoughue. Westminster Diary: A Reluctant Minister under Tony Blair.  London: I.B.Taurus, 2016.  
 Bernard Donoughue. Westminster Diary Volume 2: Farewell to Office. London: I.B. Tauris, 2017.

Critical studies and reviews of Donoughue's work
Downing Street diary

References

External links

1934 births
Living people
20th-century British male writers
21st-century British male writers
Academics of the London School of Economics
Alumni of Lincoln College, Oxford
Alumni of Nuffield College, Oxford
British autobiographers
British diarists
Fellows of the Royal Historical Society
Honorary Fellows of the London School of Economics
Labour Friends of Israel
Labour Party (UK) life peers
Members of the Fabian Society
Place of birth missing (living people)
Life peers created by Elizabeth II